Bad Girls Club: Twisted Sisters is the fifteenth season of the Oxygen reality television series Bad Girls Club. This is the eighth edition of Bad Girls Club to film in Los Angeles.. In a change from the original casting format, this season features a complete cast of sisters. Life coach Laura Baron returns for a fourth and final season.

Cast

Original Bad Girls
The season began with eight original bad girls, of which two left voluntarily and three were removed by production. Six replacement bad girls were introduced in their absences later in the season.

Replacement Bad Girls

Duration of Cast

Episodes

Notes

References

External links
 

2016 American television seasons
Bad Girls Club seasons
Television shows set in Los Angeles